Maroua Rahali is a Tunisian national champion boxer. She was born in Gaâfour, a town in north-west Tunisia.

She is coached by Chergui Hamadi. She represented Tunisia in the 2012 Summer Olympics taking place in London in the flyweight division. In the Quarter finals she lost to Mary Kom of India 6-15.

Achievements
 2011 – International Women's Tournament (Tunis, TUN) 1st place – 51 kg
 2011 – Tunisian Women's National Championships 1st place – 51 kg
 2010 – African Cup of Nations (Alger, ALG) 1st place – 51 kg
 2010 – International Women's Tournament (El-Menzah, TUN) 1st place – 51 kg
 2009 – Beja Pro-Am Gala (Beja, TUN) 2nd place – 51 kg

References

Boxers at the 2012 Summer Olympics
Living people
Tunisian women boxers
1988 births
Olympic boxers of Tunisia
Flyweight boxers